José Luis Pérez Caminero (born 8 November 1967) is a Spanish former professional footballer who played as a midfielder.

Arguably one of the best Spanish footballers of the 1990s, Caminero was able to play in any midfield position, in the middle or in the wings. Having played 408 La Liga matches over 14 seasons (57 goals), he possessed a vast array of skills: dribble, shot and physique, and his career was almost exclusively associated with Valladolid and Atlético Madrid.

Caminero represented Spain in the 1994 World Cup and Euro 1996, scoring in both tournaments.

Club career
After unsuccessfully emerging through the ranks of Real Madrid, Madrid-born Caminero signed with Real Valladolid for 1989–90, helping the side barely avoid La Liga relegation. He scored his first goal in the competition the next season, in a 3–1 home win against Valencia CF on 16 December 1990.

The peak of Caminero's career took place from 1993–94, when he moved to Atlético Madrid. He was a key member of the squad that won an historical double in 1995–96, contributing nine league goals in 37 games; accordingly, after the season, he was given the Spanish Footballer of the Year award by both the Madrid newspaper El País and the prestigious football magazine Don Balón, being the only Atlético player to win both awards the same year, and netted a career-best 14 goals the following campaign.

Caminero re-joined Valladolid at age 30, ending his career in 2004 after the team's top-flight relegation. In his final years, he further enhanced his versatility by playing in the sweeper position.

After his retirement, Caminero was installed as the club's director of football. He left the position citing personal reasons after 2007–08. In May 2011 he returned to Atlético, joining Málaga CF seven years later still in that capacity.

International career
Caminero made his Spain national team debut on 8 September 1993, in a 2–0 friendly win with Chile in Alicante. He represented the country at the 1994 FIFA World Cup in the United States, where he was the nation's leading scorer at three (scoring twice against Bolivia in a 3–1 group stage victory) and also in UEFA Euro 1996 in England, where he netted a late equaliser against France.

Caminero totalled eight goals in 21 caps, and his last appearance was against England in Euro '96, a penalty shootout loss.

Arrest
In June 2009, Caminero was arrested for possible connections to drug traffic operations, with a further 30 people being taken into custody for interrogation. He was released upon the reading of his rights.

In popular culture
Caminero's football genius also made it to the silver screen. Spanish movie director Pedro Almodóvar included his dribbling against FC Barcelona's defender Miguel Ángel Nadal in his 1997 film Live Flesh (Carne trémula).

Career statistics
Scores and results list Spain's goal tally first, score column indicates score after each Caminero goal.

Honours
Atlético Madrid
La Liga: 1995–96
Copa del Rey: 1995–96

Individual
Spanish Player of the Year: 1996

See also
List of Atlético Madrid players (+100)
List of La Liga players (400+ appearances)

References

External links

1967 births
Living people
Spanish footballers
Footballers from Madrid
Association football defenders
Association football midfielders
La Liga players
Segunda División players
Real Madrid Castilla footballers
Real Valladolid players
Atlético Madrid footballers
Spain international footballers
1994 FIFA World Cup players
UEFA Euro 1996 players
Atlético Madrid non-playing staff
Real Valladolid non-playing staff